The governing equations of a mathematical model describe how the values of the unknown variables (i.e. the dependent variables) change when one or more of the known (i.e. independent) variables change.

Mass balance 
A mass balance, also called a material balance, is an application of conservation of mass to the analysis of physical systems. It is the simplest governing equation, and it is simply a budget (balance calculation) over the quantity in question:

Differential equation

Physics
The governing equations in classical physics that are 
lectured
at universities are listed below.

 balance of mass
 balance of (linear) momentum
 balance of angular momentum
 balance of energy
 balance of entropy
 Maxwell-Faraday equation for induced electric field
 Ampére-Maxwell equation for induced magnetic field
 Gauss equation for electric flux
 Gauss equation for magnetic flux

Classical continuum mechanics 
The basic equations in classical continuum mechanics are all balance equations, and as such each of them contains a time-derivative term which calculates how much the dependent variable change with time. For an isolated, frictionless / inviscid system the first four equations are the familiar conservation equations in classical mechanics.

Darcy's law of groundwater flow has the form of a volumetric flux caused by a pressure gradient. A flux in classical mechanics is normally not a governing equation, but usually a defining equation for transport properties. Darcy's law was originally established as an empirical equation, but is later shown to be derivable as an approximation of Navier-Stokes equation combined with an empirical composite friction force term. This explains the duality in Darcy's law as a governing equation and a defining equation for absolute permeability.

The non-linearity of the material derivative in balance equations in general, and the complexities of Cauchy's momentum equation and Navier-Stokes equation makes the basic equations in classical mechanics exposed to establishing of simpler approximations.

Some examples of governing differential equations in classical continuum mechanics are

 Hele-Shaw flow
 Plate theory
 Kirchhoff–Love plate theory
 Mindlin–Reissner plate theory
 Vortex shedding
 Annular fin
 Astronautics
 Finite volume method for unsteady flow
 Acoustic theory
 Precipitation hardening
 Kelvin's circulation theorem
 Kernel function for solving integral equation of surface radiation exchanges
 Nonlinear acoustics
 Large eddy simulation
 Föppl–von Kármán equations
 Timoshenko beam theory

Biology
A famous example of governing differential equations within biology is

 Lotka-Volterra equations are prey-predator equations

Sequence of states 

A governing equation may also be a state equation, an equation describing the state of the system, and thus actually be a constitutive equation that has "stepped up the ranks" because the model in question was not meant to include a time-dependent term in the equation. This is the case for a model of an oil production plant which on the average operates in a steady state mode. Results from one thermodynamic equilibrium calculation are input data to the next equilibrium calculation together with some new state parameters, and so on. In this case the algorithm and sequence of input data form a chain of actions, or calculations, that describes change of states from the first state (based solely on input data) to the last state that finally comes out of the calculation sequence.

See also 
 Constitutive equation
 Mass balance
 Master equation
 Mathematical model
 Primitive equations

References 

Equations